FIFM may refer to:

 Festival International du Film de Marrakech, or Marrakech International Film Festival
 Festival International de Films de Montréal, or New Montreal FilmFest